Schizoretepora is a genus of bryozoans belonging to the family Phidoloporidae.

The genus has almost cosmopolitan distribution.

Species:

Schizoretepora aviculifera 
Schizoretepora calveti 
Schizoretepora dentata 
Schizoretepora elongata 
Schizoretepora fungosa 
Schizoretepora hamzai 
Schizoretepora hassi 
Schizoretepora imperati 
Schizoretepora irregularis 
Schizoretepora lutea 
Schizoretepora moharramii 
Schizoretepora pungens 
Schizoretepora robusta 
Schizoretepora serratimargo 
Schizoretepora solanderia 
Schizoretepora tamagawensis 
Schizoretepora tessellata 
Schizoretepora tumescens 
Schizoretepora vigneauxi

References

Bryozoan genera